In mathematics, multipliers and centralizers are algebraic objects in the study of Banach spaces. They are used, for example, in generalizations of the Banach–Stone theorem.

Definitions

Let (X, ‖·‖) be a Banach space over a field K (either the real or complex numbers), and let Ext(X) be the set of extreme points of the closed unit ball of the continuous dual space X∗.

A continuous linear operator T : X → X is said to be a multiplier if every point p in Ext(X) is an eigenvector for the adjoint operator T∗ : X∗ → X∗. That is, there exists a function aT : Ext(X) → K such that

making  the eigenvalue corresponding to p. Given two multipliers S and T on X, S is said to be an adjoint for T if

i.e. aS agrees with aT in the real case, and with the complex conjugate of aT in the complex case.

The centralizer (or commutant) of X, denoted Z(X), is the set of all multipliers on X for which an adjoint exists.

Properties

 The multiplier adjoint of a multiplier T, if it exists, is unique; the unique adjoint of T is denoted T∗.
 If the field K is the real numbers, then every multiplier on X lies in the centralizer of X.

See also
 Centralizer and normalizer

References

  

Banach spaces
Operator theory